Andreas Enrique Anatole Vera Ibáñez (born 14 November 1985) is a male Swedish racewalker. He has represented his country at the World Championships in Athletics on four occasions, from 2011 to 2017. He walked for Sweden at the IAAF World Race Walking Team Championships seven times consecutively from 2004 to 2016. He also competed at the European Athletics Championships in 2010, 2014 and 2018.

He competed in the 50 kilometres walk event at the 2015 World Championships in Athletics in Beijing, China, but did not finish.
 
Born in Öja, Gotland, he is the son of two international racewalkers: Mexican Enrique Vera Ibáñez and Swede Siv Gustavsson. His brother, Perseus Karlström, is also an international racewalker for Sweden.

National titles
Swedish Indoor Athletics Championships
5000 m walk: 2019

See also
 Sweden at the 2015 World Championships in Athletics

References

External links

European Athletics biography

1985 births
Living people
Sportspeople from Gotland County
Swedish male racewalkers
World Athletics Championships athletes for Sweden
21st-century Swedish people
Swedish people of Mexican descent